Uhsapw is a small island off the south coast of Pohnpei in the Federated States of Micronesia.
It lies near Enipein Pah in southern Kitti Municipality. It is covered in greenery, with a small landing point on its western shore.

References

Islands of the Federated States of Micronesia
Geography of Pohnpei